Jinglemoney Parish is a civil parish of Murray County, New South Wales.
It is located around Bombay on Bombay Creek, a tributary of the Shoalhaven River in the Queanbeyan–Palerang Regional Council.

References

Geography of New South Wales
Queanbeyan–Palerang Regional Council
Parishes of Murray County